Hypoptopoma psilogaster is a species of catfish in the family Loricariidae. It is native to South America, where it is known only from the Amazon basin. It reaches 7 cm (2.8 inches) SL.

References 

Hypoptopomatini
Fish described in 1915